Nina Lundström (born 26 October 1961) is a Swedish Liberal People's Party politician of Finnish origin. Born in Savonlinna, Finland, she was a member of the Riksdag from 2002 to 2006. From 2006 she is a municipal commissioner in Sundbyberg Municipality.

External links
Nina Lundström at the Riksdag website.

1961 births
Living people
People from Savonlinna
Finnish emigrants to Sweden
Swedish people of Finnish descent
Members of the Riksdag from the Liberals (Sweden)
Women members of the Riksdag
Members of the Riksdag 2002–2006
Members of the Riksdag 2010–2014
Members of the Riksdag 2014–2018
Members of the Riksdag 2018–2022
21st-century Swedish women politicians